The Infosys Hall of Fame Open is an international tennis tournament that has been held every year in July since 1976 at the International Tennis Hall of Fame in Newport, Rhode Island, the original location of the U.S. National Championships. The event, which was part of the Grand Prix tennis circuit from 1976 to 1989, typically features a 28 or 32-player singles draw and a 16-team doubles tournament. Each year that the tournament has been held there is an induction ceremony for the Hall of Fame. The tournament is held on outdoor grass courts, and is the last grass court tournament of the season on the ATP tour and the only grass court tournament played outside Europe, as well as the only one played after Wimbledon.  Up until 2011, when John Isner won the tournament, the top seed had never triumphed at Newport, a trait that has led to the moniker "the Casino Curse", due to the location of the Hall of Fame at the Newport Casino.

It is hosted in the week directly after Wimbledon. As such the tournament tends to get few top players competing in it; for example in 2008 its top two seeds were Mardy Fish and Fabrice Santoro, who going into the tournament had world rankings of 41 and 57, while 8th seed Kevin Anderson was ranked outside the top 100, at 115. Arguably its five most famous champions are former World No. 1 Lleyton Hewitt, former World No. 4 Greg Rusedski, former two-time Grand Slam runners-up Mark Philippoussis and Kevin Anderson, and two-time Australian Open winner Johan Kriek.

Past finals

Singles

Doubles

See also
 Newport Casino Invitational – invitational tournament held between 1915 and 1967.
 Virginia Slims of Newport – women's tournament

References

External links
Official website
ATP tournament profile
International Tennis Hall of Fame

 
Tennis tournaments in the United States
Grass court tennis tournaments
Recurring sporting events established in 1976
Tennis in Rhode Island
Campbell Soup Company
1976 establishments in Rhode Island